The 1928 Tasmanian state election was held on Wednesday, 30 May 1928 in the Australian state of Tasmania to elect 30 members of the Tasmanian House of Assembly. The election used the Hare-Clark proportional representation system — six members were elected from each of five electorates.

Labor had won the 1925 election in a landslide, with the Nationalist Party losing five seats in the House of Assembly. In 1928, leading up to the election, the Nationalists reverted to "hard politics", criticising Labor Premier Joseph Lyons for an increasing unemployment problem and economic stagnation. This shift was much to the chagrin of Lyons, who had encouraged cordial relations with the Nationalists, and referred to their leader John McPhee as a "colleague and mate".

The Labor Party won a slim majority of the vote in the 1928 election, but only fourteen seats. As the Nationalist Party held half the seats in the House of Assembly and had the support of one Independent, Nationalist leader McPhee became Premier of Tasmania, and praised Lyons for his statesmanship.

Lyons stood for the federal seat of Wilmot in 1929, and he became Prime Minister of Australia in 1932.

Results

|}

 Prior to the 1925 election, the Nationalist Party had split with a number of candidates, including former Premier Walter Lee, contesting the election under a "Liberal" banner. The grouping subsequently reunited with the Nationalists.

Distribution of votes

Primary vote by division

Distribution of seats

See also
 Members of the Tasmanian House of Assembly, 1928–1931
 Candidates of the 1928 Tasmanian state election

References

External links
Assembly Election Results, 1928, Parliament of Tasmania.
Report on General Election, 1928, Tasmanian Electoral Commission, 24 September 1928.

Elections in Tasmania
1928 elections in Australia
1920s in Tasmania
May 1928 events